Job Garner-Jacob W. Miller House is a historic home located at Harrison Township, Delaware County, Indiana. It was built about 1842, and is a two-story, square, Greek Revival style frame dwelling. It has a hipped roof, wraparound porch, wing and rear addition.

It was added to the National Register of Historic Places in 1986.

References

Houses on the National Register of Historic Places in Indiana
Greek Revival houses in Indiana
Houses completed in 1842
Houses in Delaware County, Indiana
National Register of Historic Places in Delaware County, Indiana